Pramod Dubey (born 3 December 1965) is an Indian politician, currently serving as chairman and mayor of Raipur Municipal Corporation. He is a member of the Congress Party.

Personal life 
Pramod Dubey was born in a service class Brahmin family. He is son of Late G. N. Dubey. After completing his higher secondary education from Satata Sundari KaliBadi School, he joined J. Yoganandam Chhattisgarh College Raipur. Due to his strong support for student rights, he joined the youth wing of the Indian National Congress, the National Students' Union of India, and played active role in student politics. On 17 February 1996 he married Smt. Deepti Dubey and has two children with her, Arya Dubey and Aditi Dubey.

Public life

Youth politics
Shri Dubey entered politics while pursuing graduation. He participated in student union elections in 1985–1986 and became the Vice President of Student Union at Govt. J. Yoganandam Chhattisgarh College. In 1986–1987 he won college level elections and was elected President of the Student Union at State University level. He became the Student Union president at Pandit Ravishankar Shukla University. During his tenure, Indira Gandhi Krishi Vishwavidyalaya gained its autonomy after bifurcation from Jawahar Lal Nehru Krishi Vishwavidyalaya, Jabalpur. He supported students' right to placements and worked to get students placed in the cement companies such as ACC Limited, Lafarge and Ultratech.

During 1997–2000 he was president of Raipur Urban and Rural Youth Congress during which he volunteered after the Latur earthquake relief management. In 2001 he became Vice President of Chhattisgarh Youth Congress, where he focused on youth employment and social activities such as the creation of Green Army for Plantation. Shri Dubey was elected Vice President of Govt. Housing Association from 2002 to 2010.

Parshad election
From 2004 to 2009, he served as Parshad for the Brahman Para Ward. During this time, he implemented ‘Safayi Mitra Yojna’, under which garbage is directly collected from the doorstep of each household, improving sanitation.

In 2009 he became Parshad for Shahid Chudamani Nayak ward. Dubey established a new Police Station to strengthen the Law & Order situation of the locality. He promoted Public participation and involvement in the locality.

Mayor election 
On 7 January 2015, Shri Pramod Dubey assumed office of Mayor of Raipur Municipal Corporation. He was elected as 11th Mayor of Raipur Municipal Corporation succeeding Smt. Kiranmayi Nayak.

Tenure as mayor of Raipur

Multi-level parking structure 

Chhattisgarh's first multi-level parking structure was built at an estimated cost of 11.56 Crores in one of the busiest area of the city. Spread in 2320 sqm. the multi-level parking built at Old Bus Stand G.E. Road can accommodate 200 4-wheeled vehicles and 400 2-wheeled vehicles. The parking facility would facilitate in reducing traffic pressure on roads of Jaistambh Chowk, Malviya Road, Sadar Bazar and Gole Bazar.

References 

Living people
1965 births
Mayors of places in Chhattisgarh
Chhattisgarh municipal councillors
Politicians from Raipur